The International Academy of Television Arts & Sciences (IATAS) is an American nonprofit membership organization, based in New York City, composed of leading media and entertainment executives  across all sectors of the television industry, from over fifty countries. Founded in 1969, the International Academy recognize excellence in television production produced outside the United States and it presents the International Emmy Awards in seventeen categories.

In addition to the International Emmys, the Academy's annual schedule includes the prestigious International Emmy Awards Current Affairs & News and the International Emmy Kids Awards, and a series of events such as International Academy Day, the International World Emmy Festival and Panels on substantive industry topics.

IATAS was co-founded by Ralph Baruch (1923-2016, President and Chief Executive of Viacom) and Ted Cott (1917-1973, NBC's General Manager), and was originally known as the International Council of the National Academy of Television Arts and Sciences (NATAS). Bruce Paisner is the current president and CEO of the Academy.

History 

Early in its history, the International Academy of Television Arts and Sciences was part of the National Academy of Television Arts and Sciences; however, operating with its own board with a global focus. Founded in 1969, IATAS is an organization of leading media and entertainment figures from over 500 companies from 60 countries across all television sectors, including internet, mobile and technology. Its mission is to recognize the excellence of content produced exclusively for TV outside the United States, as well as non-English language primetime programming made for American TV. The awards are presented at the International Emmy Awards Gala, held each year in November at the Hilton Hotel and Resort in Midtown Manhattan, attracting over 1,200 television professionals annually.

The first International Emmy Awards, as we know them today, were carried out in 1973. As well as the Gala, the International Academy also produces the International Emmy World Television Festival. The Television Festival screens the current year's International Emmy-nominated programs and features producers and directors who speak about their work. In 1999, the Academy went on to recognize excellence in international news coverage with the Emmy Awards for Current Affairs & News. The International Emmy Kids Awards were launched in 2013 and is held annually in February in New York City.

Categories 

Best Arts Programming
Best Performance by an Actor
Best Performance by an Actress
Best Comedy
Best Documentary
 Best Sports Documentary
Best Drama Series
 Best Short-Form Series
Best Non-English Language U.S. Primetime Program
 Best Non-Scripted Entertainment
Best Telenovela
Best TV Movie/Mini-Series
Current Affairs
News
Kids: Animation
Kids: Factual & Entertainment
Kids: Live-Action

The Academy's Foundation also presents the annual Sir Peter Ustinov Television Scriptwriting Award for young television writers. In 2013, J. J. Abrams was presented with an International Emmy Founders Award, and Anke Schäferkordt was presented with an International Emmy Directorate Award.

Notable winners
Other notable winners include Sir David Frost and Steven Spielberg.

See also
 Academy of Television Arts & Sciences
 National Academy of Television Arts and Sciences
 International Emmy Award
 List of International Emmy Award winners
 Academy of Interactive Arts & Sciences

References

External links
Official Website

+
 
Television organizations in the United States
Organizations established in 1969
International organizations based in the United States